Margrethe P. Rask (1930 – 12 December 1977), better known as Grethe Rask, was a Danish physician and surgeon in Zaïre (now the Democratic Republic of the Congo). After setting up her own hospital in the village of Abumombazi in 1972, she transferred to Danish Red Cross Hospital in Kinshasa in 1975. She returned to Denmark in 1977 after developing symptoms of an unknown infectious disease, which was later discovered to be AIDS. Three and a half years later in June 1981 the Centers for Disease Control recognized AIDS. Rask was one of the first non-Africans (along with Arvid Noe and Robert Rayford) and first non-men who have sex with men known to have died of AIDS-related causes.

Early years and Zaïre (1930–1974)
Born in 1930 in the Danish town of Thisted, Rask practiced medicine in Zaïre for a brief period in 1964, when she was recalled to Europe for training in stomach surgery and tropical illnesses, from 1972 to 1977, first at a small local hospital in the Zairian town of Abumombazi, and then at the chief surgeon at the Danish Red Cross Hospital in Kinshasa starting in 1975. 

She was likely first exposed to HIV in 1964. Her friend and colleague, Ib Bygbjerg (a physician specializing in communicable diseases), wrote in a 1983 letter to The Lancet that "while working as a surgeon under primitive conditions, she [Rask] must have been heavily exposed to blood and excretions of African patients."

Illness and death (1975–1977)
Rask suffered from symptoms of AIDS starting in late 1974, including diarrhea, swollen lymph nodes, weight loss, and fatigue. Although the symptoms receded temporarily following drug treatments in 1975, they later grew considerably worse. 

Following a vacation in South Africa in July 1977, she could no longer breathe and relied on bottled oxygen. She flew back to Denmark, where tests at Copenhagen's Rigshospitalet discovered she had contracted a number of opportunistic infections, such as Staphylococcus aureus (staph infection), candidiasis (yeast infection), and Pneumocystis jiroveci pneumonia (PCP, a fungal infection of the lungs formerly known as Pneumocystis carinii pneumonia). 

Tests also showed that Rask had a nearly non-existent T-cell count, leading to a severely depressed immune system. At the time, the doctors treating Rask were at a loss to explain her disease progression which, in retrospect, came to be seen as one of the first cases of AIDS recorded outside Africa.

After numerous tests and unsuccessful treatments, she eventually returned home to die in her cottage on a fjord in November 1977. She was cared for by Karen Strandby Thomsen. 

She was called back for more tests in December and returned to the Rigshospitalet in Copenhagen where she remained until she died of AIDS-related Pneumocystis jiroveci pneumonia on 12 December 1977. 

In 1984 her blood was tested for HIV in Denmark. The test was negative. In 1987, blood was shipped to the United States, where it was tested with two different systems. Both tests were positive for HIV.

See also
Timeline of early AIDS cases

References

Further reading 
 [Website] Photographs of the real people from Randy Shilts' history of the AIDS crisis "And the Band Played On"
Shilts, Randy, And the Band Played On, St. Martin's Press, 1987

1930 births
1977 deaths
Danish women physicians
AIDS-related deaths in Denmark
Danish surgeons
People from Thisted
Deaths from pneumonia in Denmark
20th-century Danish physicians
Health in the Democratic Republic of the Congo
20th-century women physicians
Date of birth missing
20th-century surgeons
20th-century Danish LGBT people